Lykochia is a village in the municipality of Megalopoli, Arcadia, Greece. It is situated in the southwestern foothills of the Mainalo mountains. It is 2 km northeast of Pavlia, 3 km northwest of Karatoulas, 7 km southwest of Chrysovitsi and 11 km north of Megalopoli. In 2011 Lykochia had a population of 121.

Population

See also
List of settlements in Arcadia

References

External links
 Lykochia on the GTP Travel Pages

Megalopolis, Greece
Populated places in Arcadia, Peloponnese